Poi is town and union council of Ziarat District in the Balochistan province of Pakistan. It is located at 30°21'0N 68°4'60E and has an altitude of 2057 m (6751 ft).

References

Populated places in Ziarat District
Union councils of Balochistan, Pakistan